Ostrołęka railway station is a railway station in Ostrołęka, Poland. As of 2011, it is served by Koleje Mazowieckie, who run the KM29 services from Ostrołęka to Tłuszcz, with some services continuing as KM6 services to Warsaw. The other lines from Ostrołęka are not in use.

References
Station article at kolej.one.pl

External links 
 

Railway stations in Masovian Voivodeship
Railway stations served by Koleje Mazowieckie
Buildings and structures in Ostrołęka